Bockscar, sometimes called Bock's Car, is the name of the United States Army Air Forces B-29 bomber that dropped a Fat Man nuclear weapon over the Japanese city of Nagasaki during World War II in the secondand most recentnuclear attack in history. One of 15 Silverplate B-29s used by the 509th, Bockscar was built at the Glenn L. Martin Aircraft Plant at Bellevue, Nebraska, at what is now Offutt Air Force Base, and delivered to the United States Army Air Forces on 19 March 1945. It was assigned to the 393rd Bombardment Squadron, 509th Composite Group to Wendover Army Air Field, Utah in April and was named after captain Frederick C. Bock. 

Bockscar was used in 13 training and practice missions from Tinian, and three combat missions in which it dropped pumpkin bombs on industrial targets in Japan. On 9 August 1945, Bockscar, piloted by the 393d Bombardment Squadron's commander, Major Charles W. Sweeney, dropped the "Fat Man" nuclear bomb with a blast yield equivalent to 21 kilotons of TNT over the city of Nagasaki. About 44% of the city was destroyed; 35,000 people were killed and 60,000 injured.

After the war, Bockscar returned to the United States in November 1945. In September 1946, it was given to the National Museum of the United States Air Force at Wright-Patterson Air Force Base, Ohio. The aircraft was flown to the museum on 26 September 1961, and its original markings were restored (nose art was added after the mission). Bockscar is now on permanent display at the National Museum of the United States Air Force, Dayton, Ohio, next to a replica of a Fat Man.

Airplane history

Bockscar, B-29-36-MO 44-27297, Victor number 77, was one of 15 Silverplate B-29s used by the 393d Bombardment Squadron of the 509th Composite Group. Bockscar was built by the Glenn L. Martin Company (later part of Lockheed Martin) at its bomber plant in Bellevue, Nebraska, located at Offutt Field, now Offutt Air Force Base. A Block 35 aircraft, it was one of ten modified as a Silverplate and re-designated "Block 36". 

Silverplate involved extensive modifications to the B-29 to carry nuclear weapons. The bomb bay doors and the fuselage section between the bomb bays were removed to create a single  bomb bay. British suspensions and bracing were attached for both shape types, with the gun-type suspension anchored in the aft bomb bay and the implosion type mounted in the forward bay. Weight reduction was also accomplished by removal of gun turrets and armor plating. These B-29s also had an improved engine, the R-3350-41. The Silverplate aircraft represented a significant increase in performance over the standard variants.

Delivered to the U.S. Army Air Forces on 19 March 1945, Bockscar was assigned to Captain Frederick C. Bock and crew C-13, and flown to Wendover Army Air Field, Utah in April. The name chosen for the aircraft, and painted on it after the mission, was a pun on the name of the aircraft commander. It left Wendover on 11 June 1945 for Tinian, where it arrived 16 June. It was originally given the Victor (unit-assigned identification) number 7 but on 1 August was given the triangle N tail markings of the 444th Bombardment Group as a security measure, and had its Victor changed to 77 to avoid misidentification with an actual 444th aircraft.

Bockscar was used in 13 training and practice missions from Tinian, and three combat missions in which it dropped pumpkin bombs on industrial targets in Japan, in which Bock's crew bombed Niihama and Musashino, and First Lieutenant Charles Donald Albury and crew C-15 bombed Koromo.

Atomic bomb mission

Mission and crew
The mission included three B-29 bombers and their crews: Bockscar, The Great Artiste and The Big Stink. Bockscar was flown on 9 August 1945 by Crew C-15, which usually manned The Great Artiste; piloted by Major Charles W. Sweeney, commander of the 393d Bombardment Squadron; and co-piloted by First Lieutenant Charles Donald Albury, C-15's aircraft commander. The Great Artiste was designated as an observation and instrumentation support plane for the second mission, while The Big Stinkflown by group operations officer Major James I. Hopkins Jr.as a photographic aircraft. The primary target was the city of Kokura, where the Kokura Arsenal was located, and the secondary target was Nagasaki, where two large Mitsubishi armament plants were located.

Bockscar had been flown by Sweeney and crew C-15 in three test drop rehearsals with inert Pumpkin bomb assemblies in the eight days leading up to the second mission, including a final rehearsal the day before. The Great Artiste, which was the assigned aircraft of the crew with whom Sweeney usually flew, had been designated in preliminary planning to drop the second bomb, but the aircraft had been fitted with observation instruments for the Hiroshima mission that took place three days earlier. Moving the instrumentation from The Great Artiste to Bockscar would have been a complex and time-consuming process, and when the second atomic bomb mission was moved up from 11 to 9 August because of adverse weather forecasts, the crews of The Great Artiste and Bockscar instead changed aircraft. The result was that the bomb was carried by Bockscar but flown by the crew C-15 of The Great Artiste.

Kokura and Nagasaki
During pre-flight inspection of Bockscar, the flight engineer notified Sweeney that an inoperative fuel transfer pump made it impossible to use  of fuel carried in a reserve tank. This fuel would still have to be carried all the way to Japan and back, consuming still more fuel. Replacing the pump would take hours; moving the Fat Man to another aircraft might take just as long and was dangerous as well, as the bomb was live. Group Commander Colonel Paul Tibbets and Sweeney therefore elected to have Bockscar continue the mission.

Bockscar took off from Tinian's North Field at 03:49. The mission profile directed the B-29s to fly individually to the rendezvous point, changed because of bad weather from Iwo Jima to Yakushima Island, and at  cruising altitude instead of the customary , increasing fuel consumption. Bockscar began its climb to the  bombing altitude a half-hour before rendezvous. Before the mission, Tibbets had warned Sweeney to take no more than fifteen minutes at the rendezvous before proceeding to the target. Bockscar reached the rendezvous point and assembled with The Great Artiste, but after circling for some time, The Big Stink failed to appear. As they orbited Yakushima, the weather planes Enola Gay (which had dropped the first atomic bomb on Hiroshima) and Laggin' Dragon reported both Kokura and Nagasaki within the accepted parameters for the required visual attack.

Though ordered not to circle longer than fifteen minutes, Sweeney continued to wait for The Big Stink, finally proceeding to the target only at the urging of Commander Frederick Ashworth, the plane's weaponeer, who was in command of the mission. After exceeding the original departure time limit by a half-hour, Bockscar, accompanied by the instrument airplane,The Great Artiste, arrived over Kokura, thirty minutes away.  The delay at the rendezvous had resulted in clouds and drifting smoke from fires started by a major firebombing raid by 224 B-29s on nearby Yahata the previous day covering 70% of the area over Kokura, obscuring the aiming point. Three bomb runs were made over the next 50 minutes, burning fuel and exposing the aircraft repeatedly to the heavy defenses of Yahata, but the bombardier was unable to drop visually. By the time of the third bomb run, Japanese anti-aircraft fire was getting close, and First Lieutenant Jacob Beser, who was monitoring Japanese communications, reported activity on the Japanese fighter direction radio bands.

The increasingly critical fuel shortage resulted in the decision by Sweeney and Ashworth to reduce power to conserve fuel and divert to the secondary target, Nagasaki. The approach to Nagasaki twenty minutes later indicated that the heart of the city's downtown was also covered by dense cloud. Ashworth decided to bomb Nagasaki using radar, but, according to Bockscar's bombardier, Captain Kermit Beahan, a small opening in the clouds at the end of the three-minute bomb run permitted him to identify target features. Bockscar visually dropped the Fat Man at 10:58 local time.

The failure to drop the Fat Man at the precise bomb aim point caused the atomic blast to be confined to the Urakami Valley. As a consequence, a major portion of the city was protected by the intervening hills, but even so, the bomb was dropped over the city's industrial valley midway between the Mitsubishi Steel and Arms Works in the south and the Mitsubishi-Urakami Ordnance Works in the north. An estimated 35,000 people were killed and 60,000 injured during the bombing at Nagasaki. Of those killed, 23,200–28,200 were Japanese munitions workers, 2,000 were Korean slave laborers, and 150 were Japanese soldiers.

Landing and debriefing
Because of the delays in the mission and the inoperative fuel transfer pump, the B-29 did not have sufficient fuel to reach the emergency landing field at Iwo Jima, so Sweeney flew the aircraft to Okinawa. Arriving there, he circled for 20 minutes trying to contact the control tower for landing clearance, finally concluding that his radio was faulty. Critically low on fuel, Bockscar barely made it to the runway at Yontan Airfield on Okinawa. With only enough fuel for one landing attempt, Sweeney and Albury brought Bockscar in at  instead of the normal , firing distress flares to alert the field of the uncleared landing. The number two engine died from fuel starvation as Bockscar began its final approach. Touching the runway hard, the heavy B-29 slewed left and towards a row of parked B-24 bombers before the pilots managed to regain control. The B-29's reversible propellers were insufficient to slow the aircraft adequately, and with both pilots standing on the brakes, Bockscar made a swerving 90-degree turn at the end of the runway to avoid running off the runway. A second engine died from fuel exhaustion by the time the plane came to a stop. The flight engineer later measured fuel in the tanks and concluded that less than five minutes total remained.

Following the mission, there was confusion over the identification of the plane. The first eyewitness account by war correspondent William L. Laurence of The New York Times, who accompanied the mission aboard the aircraft piloted by Bock, reported that Sweeney was leading the mission in The Great Artiste. However, he also noted its "Victor" number as 77, which was that of Bockscar, writing that several personnel commented that 77 was also the jersey number of the football player Red Grange. Laurence had interviewed Sweeney and his crew in depth and was aware that they referred to their airplane as The Great Artiste. Except for Enola Gay, none of the 393d's B-29s had yet had names painted on the noses, a fact which Laurence himself noted in his account, and unaware of the switch in aircraft, Laurence assumed Victor 77 was The Great Artiste. In fact, The Great Artiste was Victor 89.

Current status 

After the war, Bockscar returned to the United States in November 1945 and served with the 509th at Roswell Army Air Field, New Mexico. It was nominally assigned to the Operation Crossroads task force, but there are no records indicating that it deployed for the tests. In August 1946, it was assigned to the 4105th Army Air Force Unit at Davis-Monthan Army Air Field, Arizona, for storage.

At Davis-Monthan it was placed on display as the aircraft that bombed Nagasaki, but in the markings of The Great Artiste. In September 1946, title was passed to the Air Force Museum (now the National Museum of the United States Air Force) at Wright-Patterson Air Force Base, Ohio. The aircraft was flown to the museum on 26 September 1961, and its original markings were restored. Bockscar is now on permanent display at the National Museum of the United States Air Force, Dayton, Ohio. This display, a primary exhibit in the museum's Air Power gallery, includes a replica of a Fat Man bomb and signage that states that it was "The aircraft that ended WWII".

In 2005, a short documentary was made about Charles Sweeney's recollections of the Nagasaki mission aboard Bockscar, including details of the mission preparation, titled Nagasaki: The Commander's Voice.

Crew members

Regularly assigned crew
Crew C-13 (manned The Great Artiste on the Nagasaki mission):
Captain Frederick C. Bock, aircraft commander, Greenville, Michigan
First Lieutenant Hugh Cardwell Ferguson Sr., co-pilot, Highland Park, Michigan
First Lieutenant Leonard A. Godfrey Jr., navigator, Greenfield, Massachusetts 
First Lieutenant Charles Levy, bombardier, Philadelphia, Pennsylvania
Master Sergeant Roderick F. Arnold, flight engineer, Rochester, Michigan
Sergeant Ralph D. Belanger, assistant flight engineer, Thendara, New York
Sergeant Ralph D. Curry, radio operator, Hoopeston, Illinois
Sergeant William C. Barney, radar operator, Columbia City, Indiana
Sergeant Robert J. Stock, tail gunner, Fort Wayne, Indiana

Nagasaki mission crew

Crew C-15 (normally assigned to The Great Artiste):
Major Charles W. Sweeney, aircraft commander, North Quincy, Massachusetts 
Captain Charles Donald "Don" Albury, co-pilot (pilot of Crew C-15), Miami, Florida
Second Lieutenant Frederick "Fred" J. Olivi, regular co-pilot, Chicago, Illinois 
Captain James F. Van Pelt Jr., navigator, Oak Hill, West Virginia
Captain Kermit K. Beahan, bombardier, Houston, Texas
Master Sergeant John D. Kuharek, flight engineer, Sharpsburg, Pennsylvania
Staff Sergeant Raymond C. Gallagher, gunner, assistant flight engineer, Chicago, Illinois
Staff Sergeant Edward K. Buckley, radar operator, Lisbon, Ohio
Sergeant Abe M. Spitzer, radio operator, Bronx, New York
Sergeant Albert T. "Pappy" DeHart, tail gunner, Plainview, Texas

Also on board were the following additional mission personnel:
Commander Frederick Ashworth, USN, weaponeer
Lieutenant Philip M. Barnes, USN, assistant weaponeer
First Lieutenant Jacob Beser, radar countermeasures, Baltimore, Maryland (Beser flew on both atomic missions, serving as the radar countermeasures crewman on the Enola Gay on 6 August 1945 and on Bockscar on 9 August 1945).

National Museum of the United States Air Force display

Notes

References

External links

 Reflections from above: Fred Olivi's perspective on the mission which dropped the atomic bomb on Nagasaki
 White Light/Black Rain Official Website  (film)
 Records of the Nagasaki Atomic Bombing

Atomic bombings of Hiroshima and Nagasaki
Individual aircraft of World War II
Boeing B-29 Superfortress
Collection of the National Museum of the United States Air Force